Paul Thomas "Lefty" Sullivan (September 7, 1916 – November 1, 1988) was a Major League Baseball pitcher. In 7 career games, he had a 0–1 record, with a 4.26 ERA. He batted and threw left-handed.

Sullivan was born in Nashville, Tennessee and died in Scottsdale, Arizona.

External links

1916 births
1988 deaths
Cleveland Indians players
Major League Baseball pitchers
Baseball players from Tennessee